Haudonville is a commune in the Meurthe-et-Moselle department in north-eastern France.

Geography
The village lies in the north-eastern part of the commune, on the left bank of the river Mortagne, which forms most of the commune's northern border.

See also
Communes of the Meurthe-et-Moselle department

References 

Communes of Meurthe-et-Moselle